The Southern Collegiate Athletic Conference (SCAC), founded in 1962, is an athletic conference which competes in the NCAA's Division III.  Member institutions are located in Colorado, Louisiana, and Texas. Difficulties related to travel distances led seven former members to announce the formation of a new Southeastern US-based conference, the Southern Athletic Association, starting with the 2012–13 academic year.

Prior to 1991, the conference was known as the College Athletic Conference (CAC). The commissioner of the SCAC is Dwayne Hanberry.  The chair of the Executive Committee of the SCAC for 2022-23 is L. Song Richardson, Colorado College president.

History

Chronological timeline
 1962 - On September 1, 1962, the SCAC was founded as the College Athletic Conference (CAC). Charter members included Centre College, Southwestern University at Memphis, The University of the South of Sewanee and Washington and Lee University, which later added Washington University in St. Louis during that same year; effective beginning the 1962-63 academic year.
 1972 - WashU left the CAC, effective after the 1971-72 academic year.
 1973 - Washington and Lee left the CAC, effective after the 1972-73 academic year.
 1974 - Principia College and Rose–Hulman Institute of Technology joined the CAC, effective in the 1974-75 academic year.
 1980 - Illinois College joined the CAC, effective in the 1980-81 academic year.
 1983 - Illinois College left the CAC, effective after the 1982-83 academic year.
 1983 - Fisk University joined the CAC, effective in the 1983-84 academic year.
 1984 - Principia left the CAC, effective after the 1983-84 academic year.
 1984 - Earlham College joined the CAC, effective in the 1984-85 academic year.
 1989 - Two institutions left the CAC to join their respective new home primary conferences: Earlham to join the North Coast Athletic Conference (NCAC), and Rose–Hulman to the Heartland Collegiate Athletic Conference (HCAC), both effective after the 1988-89 academic year.
 1989 - Millsaps College and Trinity University joined the SCAC, effective in the 1989-90 academic year.
 1990 - Oglethorpe University joined the SCAC, effective in the 1990-91 academic year.
 1991 - The CAC was re-designated as the Southern Collegiate Athletic Conference (SCAC), while women's programs became part of the SCAC, effective in the 1991-92 academic year.
 1991 - Hendrix College joined the SCAC, effective in the 1991-92 academic year.
 1994 - Fisk left the SCAC to join the National Association of Intercollegiate Athletics (NAIA), effective after the 1993-94 academic year.
 1994 - Southwestern University joined the SCAC, effective in the 1994-95 academic year.
 1998 - DePauw University joined the SCAC (with Rose–Hulman re-joining), effective in the 1998-99 academic year.
 2006 - Rose–Hulman left the SCAC again to re-join  the HCAC, effective after the 2005-06 academic year.
 2006 - Austin College and Colorado College joined the SCAC, effective in the 2006-07 academic year.
 2007 - Birmingham–Southern College joined the SCAC, effective in the 2007-08 academic year.
 2011 - DePauw left the SCAC to join the NCAC, effective after the 2010-11 academic year.
 2011 - The University of Dallas joined the SCAC, effective in the 2011-12 academic year.
 2012 - Centre, Rhodes, Sewanee, Millsaps, Oglethorpe, Hendrix and Birmingham–Southern left the SCAC, effective after the 2011-12 academic year, to form the Southern Athletic Association (SAA), along with NCAA D-III Independent Berry College.
 2012 - The Centenary College of Louisiana joined the SCAC, effective in the 2012-13 academic year.
 2013 - Schreiner University and Texas Lutheran joined the SCAC, effective in the 2013-14 academic year.
 2013 - The University of California at Santa Cruz joined the SCAC as an affiliate member for men's swimming & diving, effective in the 2013-14 academic year.
 2014 - UC Santa Cruz left the SCAC as an affiliate member for men's swimming & diving, effective after the 2013-14 academic year.
 2016 - McMurry University and the University of the Ozarks joined the SCAC as affiliate members for men's and women's swimming & diving, effective in the 2016-17 academic year.
 2018 - The Denver campus of Johnson & Wales University joined the SCAC, effective in the 2018-19 academic year.
 2019 - The University of St. Thomas joined the SCAC, effective in the 2019-20 academic year.
 2020 - Johnson & Wales–Denver left the SCAC as the school announced that it would close, effective after the 2019-20 academic year.
 2022 - McMurry University will join as a full member in the fall of 2024.
 2023 - Trinity and Southwestern announce their departure from the conference, joining the Southern Athletic Association in 2025.

Member schools

Current members
The SCAC currently has nine full members, all are private schools:

Notes

Affiliate members
The SCAC currently has two affiliate members, both are private schools. McMurry University and the University of the Ozarks are affiliate members for men's and women's swimming and diving only.  McMurry was accepted in June 2014 as an affiliate member starting in the 2014–15 school year.  The University of the Ozarks was approved as an affiliate member in February 2016 to begin competition in the 2016–17 school year.

Future full members

Former members
The SCAC had 16 former full members, all were private schools:

Notes

Former affiliate members
The SCAC had one former affiliate member, which was also a private school. The University of California, Santa Cruz was an affiliate member in men's swimming and diving only during the 2013–14 school year.

Membership timeline

Conference overview
Prior to the 2012 conference split, the SCAC fielded competition in baseball, basketball, cross country, field hockey, football, golf, lacrosse, soccer, softball, swimming and diving, tennis, outdoor track and field and volleyball. With membership greatly reduced and in flux, some of these sports (field hockey, women's lacrosse) no longer have enough participants (zero and two, respectively) to allow the conference to sponsor them.  In addition, after struggling with only four football playing schools for several seasons, the conference in November 2015 announced football would be discontinued as a conference sport effective the 2017–18 school year, with football playing institutions affiliating with either the American Southwest Conference or the Southern Athletic Association.  On July 21, 2018, the conference announced that men's and women's lacrosse would once again be offered as conference sports, and made a commitment to holding an eSports championship in 2019. With only four schools fielding women's lacrosse teams, and five men's, the conference champions will not qualify for an automatic bid to the NCAA playoffs.

Unlike many Division III conferences, where geography is the primary determining factor for membership, the SCAC is made up of private institutions where the primary focus is on academics; the New England Small College Athletic Conference and University Athletic Association are other athletic associations with similar academic emphasis. Almost all members sport Phi Beta Kappa chapters.  Member schools are prominently featured in annual "Best College" rankings; admissions are highly selective.

In an unusual move for the conference, Colorado College, which offers two Division I (scholarship) sports, was accepted as a member beginning in the 2006–07 season.  It is the only SCAC school to offer any sort of scholarship athletics, though the Division I programs—namely men's ice hockey and women's soccer—do not compete in the SCAC. (The conference does not sponsor ice hockey for either men or women.)

The conference had previously announced its desire to expand to a total of twelve members, which would ease scheduling issues and allow the conference to divide into eastern and western divisions spread across the southern US.  On May 26, 2006, Birmingham-Southern College, one of the smallest Division I schools in the country, announced its intentions to drop scholarship athletics and join the SCAC.  This is a multi-year process subject to final approval by the NCAA.  The SCAC approved BSC's application, pending NCAA approval, on June 8, 2006.

Due to the unusual (for Division III) distances between member institutions, travel costs and durations must be factored into any decision to join the conference. Rose–Hulman cited these factors as reasons for leaving the conference when it rejoined the Heartland Collegiate Athletic Conference in 2006–07. Austin College readily took RHIT's place, moving from the American Southwest Conference before the 2006–07 season.

On June 9, 2010, DePauw University announced that it was departing the SCAC for the North Coast Athletic Conference. Like Rose-Hulman, DePauw cited "a less strenuous and more environmentally friendly travel regimen for our teams."  DePauw became a member of the NCAC for the 2011–12 season except for football, which will join for the 2012 season.

On September 22, 2010, the University of Dallas announced that it had accepted an invitation to join the SCAC at the beginning of the 2011–12 academic year.

The May 10, 2011 issue of the DePauw college newspaper, The DePauw, reported that four schools (Centre, Sewanee, Hendrix, and Rhodes) were considering leaving the conference at the end of the 2011–2012 school year, ostensibly due to travel issues and issues relating to the conference splitting into two divisions.  As the two reasons were somewhat exclusive (e.g. divisions would reduce overall travel), and other regional conferences would offer similar issues, it remained to be seen at that time what the schools planned in a post-SCAC world.

After the conclusion of the June 7, 2011 SCAC Presidents' meeting, the conference announced that seven of the twelve schools would be leaving to form a new, more compact conference based in the Southeastern US.  This transition was effective at the conclusion of the 2011–12 academic year. The schools departing include founding SCAC [CAC] members Centre, Sewanee, and Rhodes, in addition to Birmingham-Southern, Hendrix, Millsaps, and Oglethorpe. Berry College will also join the newly formed Southern Athletic Association.

The SCAC intends to remain a viable entity, enlisting other schools which subscribe to the SCAC charter.  Commissioner D. Dwayne Hanberry will remain with the conference to oversee that effort, which will be complicated by the paucity of unaffiliated Division III schools in the SCAC's new region of Texas and Colorado.  Reflecting that challenge, the conference has sought new members from the American Southwest Conference, whose geographical footprint is similar to that of the "new" SCAC. On September 28, 2011, Centenary College of Louisiana announced it would join the SCAC beginning in the 2012–13 season.  Two more ASC schools joined the SCAC for the 2013–14 season: Schreiner University announced their decision on January 23, 2012, and on February 16, 2012, Texas Lutheran University announced it too would join the SCAC.

Football was no longer be sponsored by the SCAC as of the 2017–18 school year. The conference had four schools playing in 2015 and 2016: Texas Lutheran University, Austin College, Southwestern University and Trinity University. Texas Lutheran University and Southwestern University will play football as affiliates in the ASC, while Austin College and Trinity University will be affiliates of the Southern Athletic Association.

A much-needed travel partner for isolated Colorado College will join the conference in 2018.  On February 21, 2017, the conference announced that the Denver campus of Johnson & Wales University would join the conference as it transitions from the NAIA to NCAA Division III, after the school's "exploratory year" in 2017–18. It is expected that the school will not be eligible for conference championships or NCAA playoff bids until the transition to Division III is complete, per typical NCAA practice.  The conference has already announced plans to pursue a tenth institution to better balance travel and scheduling requirements.

On February 14, 2018, the University of St. Thomas - Houston announced it would become the SCAC's 10th member after completing an exploratory year in Division III. SCAC competition would begin in the 2019-2020 season.

On June 25, 2020, Johnson & Wales University announced that it would close its Denver campus at the end of the 2020–21 school year due to concerns related to the COVID-19 pandemic, and would accept no new students at that campus effective immediately. The following day, the Denver athletic program was shut down.

On October 31, 2022, the conference announced that McMurry University, currently an affiliate in Men's and Women's Swimming and Diving, will join the conference as a full member starting with the 2024-25 season, becoming the latest school to leave the American Southwest Conference for the SCAC.  As McMurry offers football, there was speculation that the conference might once again sponsor the sport; two days later, the conference announced it would reinstate football in 2024 as long as at least four members agree to participate in SCAC play.  Austin, Southwestern, Texas Lutheran, and Trinity all are affiliated with other conferences for football and will have to complete any commitments before returning to the SCAC; in addition to McMurry, Centenary and Schreiner have nascent programs which could be ready to compete by 2024.  Finally the SCAC also announced that Lyon College will join as an associate for football only in 2024.   The conference expects Lyon, Austin, Centenary, and McMurry at a minumum in 2024 with the other schools having until 2026 to return to SCAC play.   The conference's football champion will not earn an automatic bid to the NCAA playoffs until the first year six teams participate in SCAC competition.

On March 9, 2023, the conference's plans to restart football were somewhat complicated by the announcement that Trinity and Southwestern would leave the SCAC in favor of the Southern Athletic Association with the beginning of the 2025-26 school year.  While the conference will retain enough football-playing schools to receive an automatic bid (if and only the remaining six teams meet their commitments to play football at that time), it may give the conference reason to join forces with the American Southwest Conference, which by that time will only have four schools participating in the sport and thus lack the minimum number of teams to receive an automatic playoff bid.

President's Trophy
Each year, the "President's Trophy," a 300-pound railroad bell, is awarded to the school with the best overall sports record.  Teams are awarded points for their final position in each sport; the school with the most points is declared the winner. For the 2021-22 school year, the President's Trophy was awarded to Trinity University for the 22nd time, and eleventh-straight season, both conference records.  The 174.5-point margin of victory (over second-place Southwestern) was the third-largest in conference history.

NCAA national championship teams and individuals
SCAC members have won a total of ten NCAA team championships and 34 individual championships.

Team champions:
1999–00:  Men's Tennis (Trinity); Women's Tennis (Trinity)
2002–03:  Women's Basketball (Trinity), Men's Soccer (Trinity)
2006–07:  Women's Basketball (DePauw)
2008–09:  Men's Golf (Oglethorpe)
2011–12:  Men's Golf (Oglethorpe)
2013–14:  Men's Golf (Schreiner)
2015-16:  Men's Baseball (Trinity)
2018-19:  Women's Softball (Texas Lutheran)

Individual champions:
1979–80:  Men's 400 IM (Chris Fugman, Centre)
1981-82:  Men's cross country (Mark Whalley, Principia)
1983–84:  Men's javelin, outdoor (Chris Trapp, Rose-Hulman)
1984–85:  Men's javelin, outdoor (Chris Trapp, Rose-Hulman)
1985–86:  Men's javelin, outdoor (Chris Trapp, Rose-Hulman)
1995–96:  Women's tennis, singles (Nao Kinoshita, Rhodes)
1996–97:  Women's tennis, singles (Nao Kinoshita, Rhodes); Women's tennis, doubles (Kinoshita, Taylor Tarver, Rhodes)
1997–98:  Men's pole vault, indoor (Ryan Loftus, Rose-Hulman)
1999–00:  Women's 1500 meters, indoor (Heather Stone, Sewanee); Women's 1500 meters, outdoor (Stone, Sewanee)
2002–03:  Men's 100 breaststroke (Matt Smith, Rose-Hulman)
2003–04:  Women's high jump, outdoor (Christyn Schumann, Trinity)
2004–05:  Women's high jump, indoor (Christyn Schumann, Trinity); Women's high jump, outdoor (Schumann, Trinity)
2005–06:  Women's high jump, outdoor (Christyn Schumann, Trinity)
2006–07:  Women's tennis, singles (Liz Bondi, DePauw)
2008–09:  Men's pentathlon, indoor (Todd Wildman, Trinity); Men's golf, medalist (Olafur Loftsson, Oglethorpe); Men's triple jump, outdoor (Chrys Jones, Centre)
2009–10:  Men's pentathlon, indoor (Todd Wildman, Trinity); Men's triple jump, indoor (Chrys Jones, Centre); Men's triple jump, outdoor (Chrys Jones, Centre); Women's 1-meter diving (Lindsay Martin, Trinity); Women's 3-meter diving (Hayley Emerick, Trinity)
2010–11:  Men's triple jump, indoor (Chrys Jones, Centre); Men's golf, medalist (Chris Morris, Centre)
2011–12:  Women's 60 meter hurdles, indoor (Tiarra Goode, Birmingham-Southern); Men's 200 freestyle (Jordan DeGayner, Colorado College); Women's 3-meter diving (Ruth Hahn, Trinity); Men's golf, medalist (Anthony Maccaglia, Oglethorpe); Women's 100 meter hurdles, outdoor (Tiarra Goode, Birmingham-Southern)
2013–14:  Men's 100 freestyle (Stephen Culberson, Trinity)
2016-17:  Men's 400 meter run, indoor (Marquis Brown, Texas Lutheran)

This list does not include championships won by schools outside of their period of membership in the SCAC.

Overall success on the national level
While championships come infrequently, overall SCAC athletic programs rate favorably when compared against the diverse Division III membership. The Learfield IMG College Directors' Cup provides one representation of any school's athletic success as compared to its peers. Trinity has ranked in the top five nationally twice, most recently in 2004–2005 when it placed fourth.  Trinity again led the way in 2021-22 when it placed 20th nationally; Colorado College, at 102nd, was the next school among 327 ranked institutions.

The SCAC and Division I
On several occasions the SCAC has been used as a role model for academically high-achieving Division I programs considering a move to non-scholarship athletics.  In 2004, Rice considered a move to Division III with Trinity cited as a possible model by the Houston Chronicle.  That program eventually remained in Division I.  In 2006, Birmingham-Southern College elected to leave Division I for Division III, and stated that they would seek membership in the SCAC.  This represented the first time since 1988 that a Division I school had changed affiliation to Division III.  In 2012, Centenary College of Louisiana joined the SCAC, after leaving Division I in 2011; however, its initial partner in the transition from Division I was the American Southwest Conference.

References

External links
 

 
1962 establishments in the United States
Sports leagues established in 1962
College sports in Colorado
College sports in Louisiana
College sports in Texas